Inge Sargent (born Inge Eberhard; 23 February 1932 – 5 February 2023), also known as Sao Nang Thu Sandi, was an Austrian and American author and human-rights activist who was the last Mahadevi of Hsipaw, reigning from 1957 until 1959.

Early life

Eberhard was born on 23 February 1932, in Bad Sankt Leonhard, Austria. When she was six years old, the Nazis annexed her homeland, and her mother was arrested by them on three occasions.

Following World War II, Eberhard decided to study in the United States. In 1951, she received one of the first Austrian Fulbright Scholarships and enrolled at Colorado Women's College.

Queen consort 

At a party for international students, Eberhard met Sao Kya Seng, an engineering student from Burma who attended the Colorado School of Mines. The couple married on 7 March 1953 at the home of a friend in Colorado. Following his graduation, the couple moved to Burma. Hundreds of people had gathered at the port of Rangoon to welcome the couple. It was then that her husband revealed that he was the prince of Hsipaw and that she was the mahadevi (consort). 

She learned to speak Shan and Burmese, and worked to improve life in Hsipaw. She became involved in charitable projects such as establishing birthing clinics, teaching villagers better nutrition, and starting a trilingual school. After nine years as rulers of Hsipaw, the couple had two daughters, Sao Mayari and Sao Kennari. The couple's altruistic efforts quickly made them two of Southeast Asia's best-loved rulers.

In 1962, the Burmese army staged a coup under the leadership of General Ne Win. Sao Kya Seng was arrested and imprisoned, and Inge and her two daughters were put under house arrest for two years on suspicion of her being a CIA spy. During these years, she worked tirelessly to discover what happened to her husband, eventually learning that he had been killed in prison. She fled with her daughters to Austria with the help of an Austrian embassy official.

Later life 
After living with her parents for two years, Eberhard decided to return to Colorado and she became a high-school German teacher at Centennial Junior High School and Fairview High School in Boulder. She retired from her teaching career in 1993.

In 1968, Eberhard met and married her second husband Howard "Tad" Sargent, who encouraged her to write her biography. Her memoir Twilight over Burma was published in 1994. All profits from her book are donated to Burmese refugees living near the borders of Myanmar. She says writing it was a cathartic experience: "Before I wrote the book I used to have nightmares of running with my two little girls while bullets flew past us. But since finishing the book, the nightmares have ended." A film adaptation of the book, Twilight Over Burma, was created in 2015 and starred Maria Ehrich as Eberhard. The film adaptation was banned in Myanmar.

In 1995, Sargent and her husband established the Burma Lifeline Foundation, a charity that aimed to raise funds to help those fleeing the military regime in Burma. In 2000, she was awarded the International Human Rights Award for her continued support for ethnic minorities and for the founding of the Burma Lifeline Foundation. She appeared in a documentary, The Last Mahadevi, in 1999.

Sargent died at home in Boulder, Colorado, on 5 February 2023, at age 90.

Books
 1992: The Prince of Hsipaw: A True Story of Burma
 1994: Twilight Over Burma: My Life as a Shan Princess

Films
The Last Mahadevi (1999 documentary)
Twilight Over Burma (2015 biographical film)

References

1932 births
2023 deaths
20th-century American writers
20th-century Austrian women writers
21st-century Austrian women writers
American human rights activists
Austrian emigrants to the United States
Austrian human rights activists
Colorado Women's College alumni
People from Hsipaw
Politics of Myanmar
Queens consort
Women human rights activists
Writers from Boulder, Colorado